Bolshaya Kozlovka is a rural locality (a village) in Andreyevskoye Rural Settlement, Sudogodsky District, Vladimir Oblast, Russia. The population was 2 as of 2010.

Geography 
Bolshaya Kozlovka is located 13 km east of Sudogda (the district's administrative centre) by road. Malaya Kozlovka is the nearest rural locality.

References 

Rural localities in Sudogodsky District